The 76ers–Celtics rivalry is a National Basketball Association (NBA) rivalry between the Philadelphia 76ers and the Boston Celtics. The two teams have the most meetings in the NBA playoffs, playing each other in 21 series (and the 1954 Eastern Division Round Robin), with the Celtics winning 14 of them. The 76ers are considered to be the Celtics' second greatest rival, after the Los Angeles Lakers.

History

Celtics–Nationals rivalry
The Syracuse Nationals and Boston Celtics played in the Eastern Division in the 1950s. The Nationals beat the Celtics in three straight playoff series in 1954, 1955, and 1956, winning the NBA Championship in 1955. After the 1956 season the Celtics traded for Bill Russell and drafted K.C. Jones, both of whom starred and won Championships at the University of San Francisco. Also adding Tom Heinsohn with a territorial pick, the Celtics would win their next three playoff series against the Nationals in the playoffs (1957, 1959, and 1961) before the Nationals were sold and moved to Philadelphia.

Chamberlain and Russell
In 1963, the Syracuse Nationals moved to Philadelphia and became the 76ers, renewing the basketball rivalry between Philadelphia and Boston (from when the Warriors had been in Philadelphia). Shortly after the All-Star break in 1965, the Sixers acquired Wilt Chamberlain from the Warriors, bringing the Chamberlain/Russell matchup back into the rivalry as well.

The Celtics and Sixers met in the Eastern Conference Finals that season with a trip to the NBA Finals on the line. The series went the distance, with Game 7 being held at the Boston Garden. With 5 seconds left and Boston leading 110–109, Russell tried to inbound the ball when it hit a guy wire that supported the backboard, which resulted in a turnover. However, the Sixers failed to capitalize when Celtics forward John Havlicek deflected the inbound pass to Sam Jones, who ran out the clock. The Celtics advanced to the NBA Finals and defeated the Los Angeles Lakers in five games for their seventh straight title.

In the 1966 season, the Sixers looked poised to end Boston's 7-year reign as NBA Champions; Philadelphia won the regular season series against Boston 6–4 and finished 55–25 to beat out the Celtics by one game and win the number one seed in Eastern Division. Chamberlain also won the MVP over Russell, who had won three of the previous four awards. When they met in the Conference Championship however, Boston defeated Philadelphia 4-1 and went on to win their eighth straight NBA Championship.

The next year the Sixers brought in Alex Hannum as head coach. Hannum had also coached the Bob Pettit-led St. Louis Hawks to the 1958 NBA Championship-the last year someone had defeated the Celtics in the championship. The Sixers went a then-NBA record 68-13 while the Celtics were 60–21. In the Eastern Conference Finals, the Sixers overpowered Boston, beating them in five games and ending Boston's eight-year reign as NBA champions. The Sixers won the NBA Championship by beating the San Francisco Warriors in six games, giving the Sixers and Chamberlain their first title. The 1966-67 76ers were voted in 1980 as being the greatest team in the history of the NBA to that point.

In 1968, the Sixers finished 62–20, eight games above Boston, and Chamberlain won his third consecutive MVP award. Both teams met in the Conference Championship again, and the Celtics won the Series in seven games after trailing 3–1, and went on to win the 1968 NBA Championship. After the season, 76ers head coach Alex Hannum left the NBA for the ABA in order to move closer to his family on the West Coast, and Chamberlain requested a trade, and was traded to Los Angeles.

Without Wilt, the Sixers managed a 55–27 record. Though Philadelphia again won the regular-season series against the Celtics, they were no match for Boston in the playoffs and lost 4–1. The Celtics went on to win the championship, their 11th in 13 seasons. After this season, Russell retired and both teams would not meet in the playoffs until 1977. The only two years Russell's Celtics did not win the championship, they lost to teams coached by Alex Hannum.

Dr. J and Bird
The Sixers slumped until acquiring Julius Erving before the 1977 season. They became a contender in the East, and in Erving's first season with the team, the Sixers eliminated the defending champion Boston Celtics in a tough seven-game Eastern semifinals in 1977.  Boston slumped for the next two seasons while Philadelphia continued to be a strong team in the NBA, but in 1978, the Celtics drafted Indiana State forward Larry Bird in the hope of reviving their glory years as a franchise. Bird joined the team for the 1980 season and his impact was immediate. The Celtics improved from a 29–53 record in the 1978–79 season to a league-best 61–21 record in 1979–1980, advancing to the Eastern Conference Finals that season to face the Sixers. The Sixers beat Boston in 5 but failed to win the title against the Lakers.

The next season, both the Celtics and the Sixers finished with the best record in the NBA at 62–20, but Boston held the tiebreaker in the ranking.   In a classic 7-game Eastern Finals, the Celtics beat the 76ers in 1981 4–3, coming all the way back from a 3–1 deficit to win the next 3 games in classic finishes. The Celtics won Games 5 and 6 by 2 points each and the seventh game by 1 point, 91–90, coming back from a 7-point deficit with a few minutes left to win on a Larry Bird banker from the left side with barely a minute left.   The Celtics then defeated the Houston Rockets on their way to their first title in 5 years. For the 1981–1982 season, the Celtics again had the best record  in the NBA at 63–19, followed by Philadelphia at 58–24, with one of the Sixers' key victories in the regular season being a win in Boston to snap the Celtics' 18-game winning streak. In the 1982 Eastern Finals, Boston attempted to come back from a similar 3–1 predicament and managed to extend the series to seven games, with the seventh game playing in raucous Boston Garden. However, Philadelphia had the last laugh, winning Game 7. In that finale, as Boston fans saw their team losing, in a show of respect, they congratulated the Sixers by shouting the now-famous "Beat L.A." chant as the Sixers were about to face the well-rested Lakers. In the end, however, the weary Sixers couldn't keep up, losing to the Lakers in the Finals.

The next season, the Sixers picked up MVP Moses Malone from the Houston Rockets. Malone repeated as the MVP and led the 76ers to an NBA Championship in a 4-game sweep against the Lakers. With the Bucks sweeping Boston, it made the Sixers' title run much easier.

The "highlight" of this era of the rivalry was a 1983 exhibition game that featured 3 separate fights: Moses Malone/Cedric Maxwell, Larry Bird/Marc Iavaroni, and Gerald Henderson/Sedale Threatt. During Bird/Iavaroni, Bird ripped 76ers coach Billy Cunningham's sports jacket in half. The fight was reaching a peak when 66-year-old Red Auerbach came down from the stands to restore order. For his actions, Auerbach was fined $2,500 by the NBA. There was also a memorable 1985 choking match between Bird and Erving.

Since 1984, the only times the two teams met in the playoffs were in 1985, 2002, 2012, and 2018.  Though the 1983–84 season saw the Celtics win the title and the Sixers upset in the first round by the New Jersey Nets, the Sixers had a measure of satisfaction in the regular season by winning 4 of their 6 regular season games versus Boston, the only time the Sixers managed to win the regular season series versus Boston in the Larry Bird era. Charles Barkley joined the Sixers for the 1984–85 season, and the 1985 Eastern Final series was the Sixers' last conference final until 2001. In the 1985 Finals, they lost to Boston in five games after Boston had won the first 3 games, including a third game in Philadelphia where Julius Erving was uncharacteristically booed by the home crowd for his poor play. Game 5 saw Larry Bird pick off Andrew Toney with a few seconds left and Boston up by 2, then dribble up court to preserve the Celtics' close victory, reminiscent of John Havlicek's series-clinching steal in 1965.

Lull and rebuilding
After the 1985 playoffs, the rivalry would die down. Bird and the Celtics would win one more championship in 1986, but the Sixers would not reach another conference finals until 2001. The Sixers saw a steep decline through the rest of the '80's, trading Malone and Cheeks along with the retirements of Erving and Toney. Charles Barkley emerged as the Sixers new leader and a prominent NBA superstar, however he was not able to get the team past the second round. Though considered an MVP candidate in his prime, the Sixers traded him in 1992 and went through a period of rebuilding.

After winning the championship in 1986, the Celtics also began a decline that started with tragedy. Two days after they drafted him in the 1986 draft, Len Bias died of a drug overdose. Reggie Lewis died of a heart attack in his prime in 1993. The Celtics then missed the playoffs in 1994, and did not post a winning record until the 2001–02 season.

Despite the 90's being a period of stagnation for both teams, it did produce some key developments. Allen Iverson was drafted by the 76ers as the first overall pick in the 1996 draft, and the Celtics would draft Paul Pierce two years later. Both players would become superstars in the league and lead their respective team into the playoffs numerous times.

In 2002, the Celtics, in their first appearance since 1995, won the first round meeting 3–2 over the defending conference champion 76ers. That series featured the scoring exploits of Allen Iverson and Paul Pierce.

The two teams met again in the 2012 Eastern Conference Semifinals, which the Celtics won 4–3. The fourth seeded Celtics defeated the eight seeded Sixers in a tight, back and forth series.

The teams met again in the 2018 Eastern Conference Semifinals as both team advanced from the first round lead by the arriving of the New fellow star Jayson Tatum from Celtics with Ben Simmons and Joel Embiid from 76ers, respectively. Which the Celtics won 4–1,

The teams met again in the first round of the 2020 NBA playoffs and the Celtics swept the series 4–0. This series took place in the 2020 NBA Bubble.

The Boston Strangler
Boston sportswriters dubbed Sixers' shooting guard Andrew Toney "The Boston Strangler" because of his ability to take control of games against the Celtics. He is remembered for scoring 25 points against Boston in the fourth quarter on March 21, 1982, at the Philadelphia Spectrum. It is still the Sixers' team record for most points scored in a quarter. He also scored a team-high 33 points in the classic Game 7 of the 1982 Eastern Finals in Boston (the famous "Beat LA!" game), leading the Sixers to the Finals and avoiding a second straight meltdown in the Eastern Finals versus Boston. Andrew Toney's ability to have big scoring games in the playoffs versus the Celtics was one of the reasons for the Celtics in acquiring defensive ace and Hall of Famer Dennis Johnson from the Phoenix Suns prior to the 1983–84 season, and Johnson would go on to have several great seasons with the Celtics, winning two titles with them in 1984 and 1986.

Head-to-head

Statistics

Common individuals

Players
The following players have played for both the 76ers and the Celtics in their careers:
 Jim Barnett - Celtics; 76ers
 Dana Barros – 76ers (–); Celtics (–)
 Bruce Bowen – Celtics (–); 76ers
 Mel Counts – Celtics (–); 76ers
 Ricky Green – 76ers; Celtics
 Al Horford – Celtics (–; –present), 76ers
 Bailey Howell – Celtics (–); 76ers
 Amir Johnson – Celtics (–); 76ers (–)
 Toby Kimball – Celtics; 76ers
 Tony Massenburg – Celtics; 76ers
 Mike Muscala – 76ers; Celtics (–present)
 Bob McAdoo – Celtics; 76ers
 Ed Pinckney – Celtics (–); 76ers
 Vincent Poirier – Celtics; 76ers       
 Theo Ratliff – 76ers (–); Celtics
 Josh Richardson – 76ers; Celtics
 Rodney Rogers– Celtics; 76ers
 Brian Shaw – Celtics (–); 76ers
 Derek Smith – 76ers (–); Celtics
 Andre Turner – Celtics; 76ers
 Evan Turner – 76ers (–); Celtics (–)

Others
The following individuals have also played, coached and/or managed both the Celtics and 76ers in their careers:
Ron Adams – 76ers (1994–96 assistant coach); Celtics (2013–14 assistant coach)
Ed Badger – Celtics (1984–88 assistant coach); 76ers (1996–97 assistant coach)
Lester Conner – Celtics (1998–04 assistant coach); 76ers (2004–05 assistant coach)
Chris Ford – Celtics (1978–82 player; 1983–90 assistant coach, 1990–95 head coach); 76ers (2003–04 assistant coach, 2004 interim head coach)
Dick Harter – Celtics (2001–04 assistant coach); 76ers (2004–07 assistant coach)
John Kuester – Celtics (1995–97 assistant coach); 76ers (1997–03, 2005–06 assistant coach)
Jim O'Brien – Celtics (1997–01 assistant coach, 2001–04 head coach); 76ers (2004–05 head coach, 2016–19 assistant coach)
Doc Rivers – Celtics (2004–13 head coach); 76ers (2020–present head coach)
Ime Udoka – 76ers (2019–20 assistant coach); Celtics (2021–22 head coach)
Frank Vogel – Celtics (2001–04 assistant coach); 76ers (2004–05 assistant coach)
Jamie Young – Celtics (2011–21 assistant coach); 76ers (2021–present assistant coach)

See also
 National Basketball Association rivalries
 Bruins–Flyers rivalry

References

Philadelphia 76ers
Boston Celtics
National Basketball Association rivalries